Savin Hill station is a rapid transit station in Boston, Massachusetts. It serves the Ashmont branch of the MBTA's Red Line. It is located at 121 Savin Hill Avenue adjacent to Sydney Street in the Savin Hill area of the Dorchester neighborhood. Opened in 1845 as a commuter rail station, Savin Hill was converted to rapid transit in 1927 and rebuilt in 2004–05 for accessibility. Averaging 2,199 daily boardings by a FY 2019 count, Savin Hill is the least-used station on the Red Line.

History

Old Colony Railroad
The Old Colony Railroad opened from Plymouth to South Boston in November 1845. A station was built at Savin Hill, located just north of the modern location. In December 1872, the Old Colony opened its Shawmut Branch to Milton, which added local service to Savin Hill. Around that time, the station was moved to its modern location just south of Savin Hill Avenue. The new station featured a brick building on the west side of the tracks and a wooden building on the east side (the Old Colony had left-hand running until 1895, so the larger brick building was originally on the inbound side). The station was served only by local trains on the outer tracks, while express trains used the inner tracks.

Conversion to rapid transit
Commuter rail service on the Shawmut Branch ended in September 1926. The Boston Elevated Railway, which had bought the line, began converting it into the Dorchester Extension, a rapid transit extension of the Cambridge-Dorchester Tunnel line. Savin Hill, located on the Old Colony mainline, was rebuilt as a rapid transit station as part of the extension. The commuter rail platforms and station buildings were removed, though a temporary station was used until November 4, 1927. Savin Hill reopened on November 5, 1927 along with Columbia and Fields Corner as part of the first phase of the extension.

In 1934, the Boston Elevated Railway requested the addition of a busway on the west side of the station. Construction on the busway and a pedestrian overpass to the platform began in August and finished in December 1934. Fare control was relocated to the platform level; a platform extension to the south was constructed - without interrupting train service - to accommodate this. When the bus routes were diverted away from the station in 1962, the busway was converted to a parking lot.

Savin Hill station was further modified during the remainder of the 20th century with the removal of the waiting room in the 1970s and a longer platform extension in the late 1980s to allow 6-car trains. By the end of the century, however, it still contained the most original structure of any of the pre-war stations on the line. However, like the rest of the stations on the branch, Savin Hill was not accessible, placing it in violation of the Americans with Disabilities Act of 1990.

2004–05 reconstruction

The MBTA broke ground for the Red Line Rehabilitation Project – a $67 million reconstruction of Shawmut, Fields Corner, and Savin Hill stations – in October 2003. Construction began in March 2004. The 1927-built station was closed on May 9, 2004, and was completely razed to make way for the new ADA-compliant station which involved adding elevators for full accessibility. A bus shuttle was run from JFK/UMass station during the 14-month closure, which ended with the opening of the new station on July 31, 2005. The closure was originally scheduled to last 10 months, but was delayed by inclement weather and slow procurement of structural steel. Most of the station was complete by April 2005; however, it could not be reopened until the accessible elevators and escalators were completed. Original plans to include public art as part of the Arts on the Line program were removed in budget cuts; only historical interpretive panels were installed.

Station layout

Trains on the Braintree branch of the Red Line and the Old Colony and Greenbush commuter rail lines run past Savin Hill on parallel tracks without stopping. Nearby JFK/UMass, a busy transfer station, received a Braintree branch platform in 1988 and a commuter rail platform in 2001. However, Savin Hill primarily serves the local neighborhood and is therefore served by only Ashmont branch trains.

In January 2012, the state's Central Transportation Planning staff released a conceptual plan for widening the Southeast Expressway which would involve rearranging Savin Hill station. In this scenario, a second commuter rail track would be added and both placed in a shallow cut-and-cover tunnel under the southbound lanes, while the Braintree branch tracks would be placed in a deeper tunnel. The Ashmont branch tracks and station would remain in place.

Bus connections
Savin Hill is not directly served by any MBTA bus routes. However, route  runs on Dorchester Avenue about one-tenth of a mile from the station. This route is the successor to streetcar service which once ran on Dorchester Avenue from South Station to River Street in Milton. The next station to the south, Fields Corner, is a major bus transfer station.

Until the 1960s, four bus routes including the 18 terminated at Savin Hill. However, the M.T.A. desired to build a parking lot at the Savin Hill busway location. In September and December 1962, the 13 and 14 routes were rerouted away from Savin Hill to keep buses off local streets, while the 12 and 18 were combined into the modern 18 route.

References

External links

MBTA – Savin Hill
 Savin Hill Avenue entrance from Google Maps Street View
 Sydney Street entrance from Google Maps Street View

Dorchester, Boston
Red Line (MBTA) stations
Railway stations in Boston
Railway stations in the United States opened in 1927
Stations along Old Colony Railroad lines